Andrés Vera Llorens (born 31 December 1960 in Castellón de la Plana) is a retired Spanish middle-distance runner who specialised in the 1500 metres. He represented his country at the 1984 Summer Olympics, where he finished seventh in the final, as well as one outdoor and one indoor World Championships.

International competitions

Personal bests
Outdoor
800 metres – 1:46.85 (Madrid 1984)
1000 metres – 2:17.78 (Nice 1985)
1500 metres – 3:35.86 (A Coruña 1986)
One mile – 3:55.33 (Oslo 1984)
2000 metres – 5:02.78 (Seville 1986)
Indoor
800 metres – 1:50.09 (Budapest 1983)
1500 metres – 3:40.51 (Piraeus 1985)

References

All-Athletics profile

1960 births
Living people
Sportspeople from Castellón de la Plana
Spanish male middle-distance runners
Athletes (track and field) at the 1984 Summer Olympics
Olympic athletes of Spain
World Athletics Championships athletes for Spain
Mediterranean Games bronze medalists for Spain
Mediterranean Games medalists in athletics
Athletes (track and field) at the 1987 Mediterranean Games
20th-century Spanish people